John William Polidori (7 September 1795 – 24 August 1821) was a British writer and physician. He is known for his associations with the Romantic movement and credited by some as the creator of the vampire genre of fantasy fiction. His most successful work was the short story "The Vampyre" (1819), the first published modern vampire story. Although the story was at first erroneously credited to Lord Byron, both Byron and Polidori affirmed that the author was Polidori.

Family
John William Polidori was born on 7 September 1795 in Westminster, the oldest son of Gaetano Polidori, an Italian political émigré scholar, and his wife Anna Maria Pierce, an English governess. He had three brothers and four sisters.

His sister, Frances Polidori, married the exiled Italian scholar Gabriele Rossetti, and thus Polidori, posthumously, became the uncle of Maria Francesca Rossetti, Dante Gabriel Rossetti, William Michael Rossetti, and Christina Georgina Rossetti. William Michael Rossetti published Polidori's journal in 1911.

Biography
Polidori was one of the earliest pupils at the recently established Ampleforth College from 1804. In 1810 he went up to the University of Edinburgh, where he wrote a thesis on sleepwalking and received his degree as a doctor of medicine on 1 August 1815, at the age of 19.

In 1816, which became known as the Year Without a Summer, Polidori entered Lord Byron's service as his personal physician and accompanied him on a trip through Europe. Publisher John Murray offered Polidori 500 English pounds to keep a diary of their travels, which Polidori's nephew William Michael Rossetti later edited. At the Villa Diodati, a house Byron rented by Lake Geneva in Switzerland, the pair met with Mary Wollstonecraft Godwin, her husband-to-be, Percy Bysshe Shelley, and their companion (Mary's stepsister) Claire Clairmont.

One night in June after the company had read aloud from Fantasmagoriana, a French collection of German horror tales, Byron suggested they each write a ghost story. Percy Bysshe Shelley wrote "A Fragment of a Ghost Story" and wrote down five ghost stories recounted by Matthew Gregory "Monk" Lewis, published posthumously as the Journal at Geneva (including ghost stories) and on return to England, 1816, the journal entries beginning on 18 August 1816. Mary Shelley worked on a tale that would later evolve into Frankenstein. Byron wrote (and quickly abandoned) a fragment of a story, "A Fragment", featuring the main character Augustus Darvell, which Polidori used later as the basis for his own tale, "The Vampyre", the first published modern vampire story in English.

Polidori's conversation with Percy Bysshe Shelley on 15 June 1816, as recounted in The Diary, is regarded as the origin or genesis of Frankenstein. They discussed "the nature of the principle of life": "June 15 - ... Shelley etc. came in the evening ... Afterwards, Shelley and I had a conversation about principles — whether man was to be thought merely an instrument."

Dismissed by Byron, Polidori traveled in Italy and then returned to England. His story, "The Vampyre", which featured the main character Lord Ruthven, was published in the April 1819 issue of New Monthly Magazine without his permission. Whilst in London he lived on Great Pulteney Street in Soho. Much to both his and Byron's chagrin, "The Vampyre" was released as a new work by Byron. Byron's own vampire story "Fragment of a Novel" or "A Fragment" was published in 1819 in an attempt to clear up the confusion, but, for better or worse, "The Vampyre" continued to be attributed to him.

Polidori's long, Byron-influenced theological poem The Fall of the Angels was published anonymously in 1821.

Death
Polidori died at his father's London house on 24 August 1821, weighed down by depression and gambling debts. Despite strong evidence that he died by suicide by means of prussic acid, the coroner gave a verdict of death by natural causes.

Works

Plays
 Cajetan, a play (1816)
 Boadicea, a play (1816)

Poems
 Ximenes, the Wreath and Other Poems (1819)
The Fall of the Angels: A Sacred Poem (1821)

Novellas

 The Vampyre: A Tale (1819) - a text that is "often even cited as almost folkloric sources on vampirism".
 Ernestus Berchtold; or, The Modern Oedipus: A Tale (1819)

Non-fiction
 A Medical Inaugural Dissertation which deals with the disease called Oneirodynia, for the degree of Medical Doctor, Edinburgh (1815)
 The Diary of Dr. John William Polidori (1816, published posthumously in 1911)
 On the Punishment of Death (1816)
 An Essay Upon the Source of Positive Pleasure (1818)
 Sketches Illustrative of the Manners and Costumes of France, Switzerland and Italy (1821)

Posthumous editions

His sister Charlotte transcribed Polidori's diaries, but censored "peccant passages" and destroyed the original. Based only on the transcription, The Diary of John Polidori was edited by William Michael Rossetti and first published in 1911 by Elkin Mathews (London). Reprints of this book, The Diary of Dr. John William Polidori, 1816, relating to Byron, Shelley, etc., was published by Folcroft Library Editions (Folcroft, PA) in 1975, and by Norwood Editions (Norwood, PA) in 1978. A new edition of The Diary of John William Polidori was reprinted by Cornell University in 2009.

Legacy

Memorials
A memorial plaque on Polidori's home at 38 Great Pulteney Street was unveiled on 15 July 1998 by the Italian Ambassador, Paolo Galli.

Appearances in other media

Film 
Multiple films have depicted John Polidori, and the genesis of the Frankenstein and "Vampyre" stories in 1816:
Gothic (1986), directed by Ken Russell, with Timothy Spall as Polidori 
Haunted Summer (1988), directed by Ivan Passer, with Alex Winter as Polidori 
Remando al viento (1988; English title: Rowing with the Wind) directed by Gonzalo Suárez
Mary Shelley (2017), directed by Haifaa Al-Mansour

Additionally, Polidori's name was used for fictional characters in the following films:
Frankenstein: The True Story (1973), a television movie featuring a character named Dr. Polidori
Vampires vs. the Bronx (2020), a film featuring a character named Frank Polidori

Literature
Polidori appears as one of several minor characters killed off by Frankenstein's creature in Peter Ackroyd's novel The Casebook of Victor Frankenstein.
Polidori is a central character in Federico Andahazi's novel The Merciful Women (Las Piadosas in the original Argentine edition). In it, he receives The Vampyre written by the fictional character of Annette Legrand, in exchange for some "favours".
Polidori appears as a character in Howard Brenton's play Bloody Poetry (though for some reason Brenton calls him William.)
Polidori is a prominent character and the catalyst in events in Brooklyn Ann's historical paranormal romance novel, Bite Me, Your Grace.
Polidori is a central character in Emmanuel Carrère's novel Gothic Romance (Bravoure in the original French edition), which, amongst other things, presents a fictionalised account of the events of 1816.
Polidori appears as a character in Susanna Clarke's novel Jonathan Strange & Mr Norrell.
Polidori appears as an enemy of Lord Byron (who is a vampire) in Tom Holland's novel Lord of the Dead.
Polidori is also the 'hero' of the novel Imposture (2007) by Benjamin Markovits.
Polidori is also the central character in Derek Marlowe's novel A Single Summer With L B, which presents an account (fictionalised) of the summer of 1816.
Polidori appears as a minor and unsympathetic character in the Tim Powers' horror novel The Stress of Her Regard (1989), in which Polidori does not write about vampires but becomes directly involved with them. In Powers' sequel (of sorts), Hide Me Among the Graves (2012), Polidori is a vampire and a central villain menacing the novel's protagonists, his nieces and nephews in the Rossetti family.
Paul West's novel Lord Byron's Doctor (1989) is a recreation, and ribald fictionalization, of Polidori's diaries. West depicts him as a literary groupie whose attempts to emulate Byron eventually unhinge and destroy him.
(2013): Polidori is a prominent character in P.J. Parker's internationally-acclaimed historic fiction  Fire on the Water: A Companion to Mary Shelley's Frankenstein
(2019): P.J. Parker's historic fiction Origin of the Vampyre pulls back the shroud of mystery surrounding the publication of Polidori's novel.
(2011): In Ben Aaronovitch's Rivers of London and the other Peter Grant books, Polidori is often cited as a source of information about the supernatural.

Opera
Polidori functions as narrator in John Mueter's one-act opera Everlasting Universe and has a speaking role in several scenes.

Television
In the Highlander: The Series episode "The Modern Prometheus", which featured Lord Byron, one of the series regulars, Methos, serves as a stand-in for Polidori. Methos, who was immortal, was Byron's mentor, friend, and physician, and experienced the same events as the real Polidori did on that (in)famous night.
In the stop-motion animated series Mary Shelley's Frankenhole, Polidori is a regular character portrayed as the immortal lab assistant of Dr. Victor Frankenstein.
Polidori was mentioned in the Tales from the Crypt episode "Ritual".
Dr. John Polidori (portrayed by John O'Hurley) was the antagonist of the fifth season The X-Files episode, "The Post-Modern Prometheus".
 Polidori was also portrayed by Noah McLaughlin in the 2016 web series A Ungenial Summer, which fictionalized the events of the summer of 1816 in the modern day. In this version, Polidori serves as a personal assistant to Lord Byron, rather than physician.
 In the episode of CBBC children's television show Horrible Histories entitled Staggering Storytellers, Polidori was portrayed by Jalaal Hartley in the sketch about the original of his story, The Vampyre and Mary Shelley's (portrayed by Jessica Ransom) story Frankenstein while at Lord Byron's Villa Diodati in Switzerland.
 Polidori is portrayed by Maxim Baldry in the 2020 Doctor Who episode "The Haunting of Villa Diodati", which depicts him as a sleepwalker.

Bibliography
 .

See also

References

Sources
 Nigel Leask, "Polidori, John William (1795–1821)", Oxford Dictionary of National Biography, Oxford University Press, 2004 Retrieved 30 April 2006.
 Rieger, James. "Dr. Polidori and the Genesis of Frankenstein." Studies in English Literature 3 (1963): 461-72. The origin of Frankenstein was in a conversation between John William Polidori and Percy Bysshe Shelley on June 15, 1816.
 Rossetti, William Michael, The Diary of Dr. John William Polidori, Elkin Matthews, 1911 Retrieved 2 October 2015.
Stott, Andrew McConnell. "The Poet, the Physician and the Birth of the Modern Vampire", The Public Domain Review. Retrieved 7 August 2017.
Stott, Andrew McConnell. The Poet and the Vampyre: The Curse of Byron and the Birth of Literature’s Greatest Monsters. New York: Canongate/Pegasus, 2013.

Further reading
 .
 .

External links

 
 Project Gutenberg's E-Text of "The Vampyre"
 
 
 .  The web's first link portal devoted entirely to John William Polidori, author of "The Vampyre".
 .
 , starring Paul Naschy.
 A Vampyre Tale
 John Polidori Life at Keats-Shelley House.org

1795 births
1821 deaths
18th-century English people
19th-century English medical doctors
19th-century English non-fiction writers
19th-century male writers
19th-century short story writers
Writers from London
English medical writers
English people of Italian descent
British people of Italian descent
Alumni of the University of Edinburgh
Polidori-Rossetti family
People educated at Ampleforth College
Suicides by cyanide poisoning
Suicides in Camden
People with bipolar disorder
Burials at St Pancras Old Church
English male non-fiction writers
Writers of Gothic fiction
1820s suicides
19th-century diarists
English horror writers